The World Figure Skating Championships is an annual figure skating competition sanctioned by the International Skating Union in which figure skaters compete for the title of World Champion.

Men's competitions took place from February 2 to 3 in Berlin, German Empire. Ladies' competition took place on January 22 in Vienna, Austria-Hungary. There were only three competitors. Pairs' competition took place on January 22 also in Vienna, Austria-Hungary. Only one pair competed. The judges for the ladies' and the pairs' competition were the same.

Results

Men

Judges:
 Mr. Eugen Dreyer 
 Mr. Jeno Minich 
 Mr. L. Panek 
 Mr. Max Rendschmidt 
 Mr. F. Schwarz 
 Mr. M. Strasilla 
 Mr. Ivar Westengrén

Ladies

Judges:
 F. Schwarz 
 Josef Fellner 
 Mrs. Schwarz 
 Martin Gordan 
 Walter Müller 
 G. Zsigmondy 
 G. Feix

Pairs

Judges:
 F. Schwarz 
 Josef Fellner 
 Mrs. Schwarz 
 Martin Gordan 
 Walter Müller 
 G. Zsigmondy 
 G. Feix

Sources
 Result list provided by the ISU

World Figure Skating Championships
World Figure Skating Championships, 1911
World 1911
World 1911
World Figure Skating Championships, 1911
World Figure Skating Championships, 1911
1911 in Austrian sport
1911 in German sport
1910s in Berlin
1910s in Vienna
January 1911 sports events